In Greco-Roman mythology, Agrippa (said to have reigned 914-873 BC) was a descendant of Aeneas and  King of Alba Longa, the capital of Latium, southeast of Rome. He was listed as king of Alba Longa in the time of Augustus. Some speculate that this was done in order to give prestige to Augustus' friend and son-in-law Marcus Vipsanius Agrippa. He was also ancestor of the legendary founders of Rome, Romulus and Remus.

Family tree

Notes

Kings of Alba Longa